Viktor Fyodorovich Dobronravov (born 8 March 1983) is a Russian theatre actor, dubbing professional, musician, and leader of the Carpet Quartet group. Merited Artist of the Russian Federation (2018). He appeared in more than 70 films.

Biography

Early life
Viktor Dobronravov was born in Taganrog, Rostov Oblast, Russian SFSR, Soviet Union (now Russia).

Personal life
He is the older brother of Russian actor Ivan Dobronravov. He is the son of Russian actor Fyodor Dobronravov and kindergarten teacher Irina Dobronravova.

Married since 23 March 2010. He and his wife have two daughters.

Selected filmography

Film

References

External links 

 
 Viktor Dobronravov on kino-teatr.ru

1983 births
Living people
Actors from Taganrog
Russian male child actors
Russian male film actors
Russian male television actors
Russian male stage actors
Russian male voice actors
21st-century Russian male actors
21st-century Russian singers
Honored Artists of the Russian Federation
21st-century Russian male singers
Musicians from Taganrog